The Scotch Malt Whisky Society (SMWS), founded in Edinburgh in 1983, is a membership organisation which bottles and sells single cask, single malt whisky. It purchases individual casks from more than 170 malt whisky distilleries in Scotland and throughout the world, bottles them and retails directly to its members. It also runs four private members' rooms in the UK and in several international locations.

History
The origins of the Society lie in Phillip "Pip" Hills' travels around the Scottish Highlands in the late 1970s, during which he sampled several whiskies drawn straight from the cask.

Hills was so affected by what he tasted that, in 1978, he persuaded several acquaintances to share in the cost of a cask from the Glenfarclas distillery. Over time, the group of friends expanded to become a small syndicate and more casks were purchased, bottled and distributed to subscribing members.

Coinciding with the decision to open membership to the wider public in 1983, the Society purchased its first property, The Vaults, in Leith; a building, whose vaulted wine cellars reputedly stretch back to the 12th century.

The Society created a set of members' rooms there.

In 1996, the Society launched a share scheme for its members, the proceeds from which were invested in the purchase of a London venue.

2004 saw the Society open a second venue in Edinburgh – a Georgian townhouse on Queen Street. In the same year, the Society was acquired by Glenmorangie plc.

To mark the 25th anniversary of its foundation, the Society redesigned its bottles, to include more information and a full tasting note on the front of the bottle.

In 2015, the Society was sold back to private investors from Glenmorangie plc (now under the ownership of LVMH).

In June 2021, the private owners floated the holding company The Artisanal Spirits Company plc on the Alternative Investment Market of the London Stock Exchange.

Membership
To buy whisky bottled by the Scotch Malt Whisky Society, it is necessary to be a member. Membership in the UK costs £65 for the first year and can be purchased with a choice of add ons. Members are required to pay a smaller annual renewal fee every year to retain membership – the cost of which varies depending on type of membership and location.

New members receive a membership pack containing 3 sample bottles of Society whisky and various other items including a Members' Handbook and Notebook, a lapel badge and membership card.

Membership entitles members to buy Society whisky and also gives members access to its private members' venues (along with the ability to bring 3 non-member guests), and the opportunity to buy tickets for various tasting events. The events are held at is members' venues and also at other non-Society venues around the country.

Members also receive a quarterly publication called Unfiltered – an award-winning  magazine that keeps them up to date on Society news, plus articles from the wider whisky world.

Locations
The Society has four Members' Rooms in the UK, where whiskies are sold by the bottle or for consumption on the premises by the dram. These are located at The Vaults, Leith; 28 Queen Street, Edinburgh; 38 Bath Street, Glasgow and 19 Greville Street, London. The Society also operates non-member bars under the Kaleidoscope brand. There is a Kaleidoscope bar situated at 28 Queen Street in Edinburgh which sits alongside the company's members–only bar. The second Kaleidoscope venue was based in Devonshire Square in central London but has since closed.

It also has branches in Australia, Austria, Belgium, Canada, China, Denmark, France, Germany, Hong Kong, Italy, Japan, Luxembourg, Malaysia, Netherlands, New Zealand, Philippines, Poland, Singapore, Sweden, Switzerland, Taiwan, Thailand, and the U.S.A.

In 2010, the Society partnered with The Hotel du Vin & Malmaison group to introduce a new 'whisky snug' bar concept to the Aberdeen Malmaison, Brighton Hotel du Vin and Birmingham Hotel du Vin.

Bottlings
Casks are only acquired by the Society after approval by an appointed 'Tasting Panel', comprising Society representatives, those directly involved in the distilling industry and various other suitably qualified parties.

The Tasting Panel also gives each bottling a whimsical set of tasting notes which provide an indication of what flavours and textures the drinker can expect. Each bottle is also given a quirky and descriptive name – such as 'Kissed up by sweet promises' or 'Intense menu of seduction'.

The resulting 'outturn' of each cask is given a unique, two-part numerical identifier, representing first the originating distillery and second the individual cask from which the bottle was taken. For example, 2.35 represents the 35th cask acquired from distillery number two. Society bottlings are always referred to using this numerical code, rather than by the distillery name, as individual casks are unique and, therefore, may not be representative of the whisky produced by that distillery for ordinary retail.

The number of bottles available from each outturn of a cask can vary – but single casks by their very nature only produce a limited amount of whisky so, more often than not, there is only a small number of bottles available, making each release rare and sought-after. The Society releases new whisky selections for its members once or twice a month.

The Society has also bottled single casks from grain whisky distilleries, identified by the prefix 'G' in the cask number. Other non-whisky spirits have been released, such as gin, rum, and cognac, as well as blended whisky and cognacs. Each variety has their own bottle number prefix.

Occasionally, the Society releases bottlings with special labels – such as the Far Flung Flavours, a set of three bottles with labels and names that break with the traditional style of Society labels. Each bottle has a specially designed label based on the key characteristics of the whisky – for example, 'Wasabi Wipe-out', which featured an illustration of a Sumo wrestler surfing on the label.

As of September 2010, around 3,597 single casks had been bottled by the Society since 1983.

Society whisky is bottled at its original cask strength, typically upwards of 55 per cent alcohol by volume (ABV). It is more common in the Scotch whisky industry to reduce the spirit at bottling to around 40 per cent and put it through a chill filtering process, which prevents it from clouding at low temperatures.

Notes

Scottish malt whisky
Organizations established in 1983
1983 establishments in Scotland
Organisations based in Edinburgh
Leith
Clubs and societies in Scotland